The 2013–14 Elite A season was the 80th season of the Serie A, the top level of ice hockey in Italy. Eight teams participated in the league, and Ritten Sport won the championship. HC Pustertal claimed the League Cup.

Regular season

Playoffs

First and second round 

Ritten Sport and HC Pustertal, with their victories, qualified for the playoff semifinals as well as the League Cup, while Asiago Hockey and HC Valpellice played in the second round against the winner of the lower group for the two remaining spots in the semifinals.

League Cup

Semifinals and Final

External links 
 Lega Italiana Hockey Ghiaccio website

Ita
Serie A
Serie A (ice hockey) seasons